Sagiz, also known as Saghyz, (Sağyz, ساعىز; , Sagiz) is a town in Atyrau Region, west Kazakhstan, near the border with Aktobe Region.

References

Atyrau Region
Cities and towns in Kazakhstan